Members of each major party in the United States Congress meet regularly in closed sessions known as party conferences (Republicans) or party caucuses (Democrats). Participants set legislative agendas, select committee members and chairs, and hold elections to choose various Floor leaders. This process takes place for both the Senate and the House of Representatives.

The Republican Conference Chairman or Democratic Caucus Chairman is the third ranking position in each chamber's party leadership, after the Majority/Minority Leader and the Majority/Minority Whip, and before the Campaign Committee Chairman (Democratic Senatorial Campaign Committee, National Republican Congressional Committee, National Republican Senatorial Committee, Democratic Congressional Campaign Committee). In the House of Representatives, if the party has a majority and controls the Speaker's chair, then the Conference/Caucus Chair ranks fourth.

Legislative branch of the United States government